Following is a list of justices of the Vermont Supreme Court:

Current membership

All justices

References

Vermont
Justices